Domenico Cantoni (born 27 January 1966) is an Italian lightweight rower. He won a gold medal at the 1991 World Rowing Championships in Vienna with the lightweight men's eight.

References

1966 births
Living people
Italian male rowers
World Rowing Championships medalists for Italy
20th-century Italian people